Not is an unincorporated community in Shannon County, Missouri, United States.

History
A post office called Not was established in 1886, and remained in operation until 1917. The community was so named on account of the knot that adorned a black oak tree near the original town site (a postal error accounts for the error in spelling that was never corrected).

References

Unincorporated communities in Shannon County, Missouri
Unincorporated communities in Missouri